Pterotrachea coronata is a species of large floating sea snail, a pelagic gastropod mollusc in the family Pterotracheidae.

This pelagic snail is not at all closely related to the pelagic opistobranchs such as the sea angels and sea butterflies. It is in the family Pterotracheidae, which is in the clade Littorinimorpha, and as such it is related to such families as the tritons (Ranellidae) and the tun shells (Tonnidae).

Description 
The maximum recorded body length is 260 mm.

Habitat 
Minimum recorded depth is 0 m. Maximum recorded depth is 250 m.

References

Further reading 
 Powell A W B, New Zealand Mollusca, William Collins Publishers Ltd, Auckland, New Zealand 1979

External links

 Tree of Life: Pterotrachea coronata
 Marenostrum

Pterotracheidae
Molluscs described in 1775
Taxa named by Peter Forsskål